Bob Ducsay (born c. 1962) is an American film editor, screenwriter and producer.

He is known for his work with Stephen Sommers, Rian Johnson and Brad Peyton. He has edited many of Sommers' films and has served as a producer on some. He aspired to be in the filmmaking industry during high school. He graduated from Saint Brendan High School in Miami, Florida, in 1980 and went on to film school.

He won the Saturn Award for Best Editing twice for Star Wars: The Last Jedi and Knives Out.

Filmography 
His credits include:

Film

References

External links 
 

American film editors
1962 births
Living people
American screenwriters
American film producers